Hudis is a surname. Notable people with the surname include:

Mark Hudis (born 1968), American television writer and producer
Norman Hudis (1922–2016), English film, theatre, and television writer
Stephen R. Hudis (born 1957), American actor and stunt coordinator